George Williams was an American football coach.   As head coach of Kansas Wesleyan in 1916, his team failed to win a game. They gave up an average of just over 40 points per game while scoring only three points for the entire season.

Coaching career
Williams was the sixth head football coach at Kansas Wesleyan University in Salina, Kansas and he held that position for the 1919 season.   His coaching record at Kansas Wesleyan was 0–8 and his team was outscored 327–3 by opponents.

Head coaching record

References

Year of birth missing
Year of death missing
Kansas Wesleyan Coyotes football coaches
Maryville Scots football coaches